Michèle Alfa (born Joséphine Blanche Alfreda Bassignot; August 20, 1911 – August 24, 1987) was a French stage and film actress. After appearing mainly in supporting roles during the 1930s she starred in a number of films during the 1940s.

During the German occupation of France she became the lover of a German propaganda officer stationed in Paris. She used her influence to secure the release of fellow actor Charles de Rochefort from an internment camp. She also hid leaders of the French Resistance.

Selected filmography
 The Beautiful Adventure (1932)
 Ramuntcho (1938)
 Lights of Paris (1938)
 Adrienne Lecouvreur (1938)
 Le Corsaire (1939)
 The Pavilion Burns (1941)
 The Last of the Six (1941)
 Le Lit à colonnes (1942)
 The Secret of Madame Clapain (1943)
 Jeannou  (1943)
 The Count of Monte Cristo (1943)
 The Secret of Madame Clapain (1944)
 Chinese Quarter (1947)
 Dark Sunday (1948)
Judicial Error (1948)
 The Winner's Circle (1950)
 Matrimonial Agency (1952)

References

Bibliography
 Riding, Alan. And the Show Went On. Gerald Duckworth, 2011.

External links

1911 births
1987 deaths
French film actresses
French stage actresses
20th-century French women